Sarsoo railway station is a railway station on the Bakhtiyarpur–Tilaiya line under the Danapur railway division of East Central Railway zone. It is situated at Nardiganj, Sarsoo in Gaya district in the Indian state of Bihar.

References 

Railway stations in Gaya district
Danapur railway division